Hassan Al Hammadi (Arabic: حسن الحمادي; born 1 May 1997) is an Emirati footballer. He currently plays as a defender .

Career

Al-Dhafar
Al Hammadi started his career at Al-Dhafra and is a product of the Al-Dhafra's youth system. On 28 May 2011, Al Hammadi made his professional debut for Al-Dhafra against Al-Nasr in the Pro League, he played with them until 2019.

Al-Shaab (loan)
On 11 January 2017, left Al-Dhafra and signed with Al-Shaab on loan until the end of the season.

References

External links
 

1989 births
Living people
Emirati footballers
Al Dhafra FC players
Al-Shaab CSC players
UAE Pro League players
UAE First Division League players
Association football defenders
Place of birth missing (living people)